Henhouse is a 1983 video game produced by Funware for the TI-99/4A home computer.

In 1983, there were three companies interested in buying out Funware: Activision, Epyx, and Creative Software. Funware was eventually sold to Creative Software. However, both Epyx and Activision would later market TI-99/4A games independently near the end of 1983. According to Michael Brouthers, it only cost Funware  to make each game cartridge.

Gameplay

References 

TI-99/4A games
1983 video games